Lucia Piussi (born 21 October 1971) is a Slovak actress and rock singer. She has played Bratislava's Stoka Theatre often, and is the frontwoman of rock band Živé kvety. Piussi studied at the Academy of Performing Arts (VŠMU) in Bratislava.

Discography 
12 + 1, Slnko records 2008
Bez konca, Živé kvety, Slnko records 2007
Sloboda, Živé kvety, Slnko records 2005
Na mojej ulici, Živé kvety, Slnko records 2004
V dobrom aj v zlom, Živé kvety, Pavian records 2003
Živé kvety, Živé kvety, Mediálny inštitút 2000

Theatre 
Strata (Multimediálna grcanica), premiere 21. 12. 2004
Gala (Kto rozjebal Betlehem), premiere 9. 6. 2003
Bol-a som nevinn -ý -á, I Was Innocent, premiere 1. 9. 2002
Komisia, premiere 12. 4. 2002
Z diaľky, premiere 17. 12. 1999
Hetstato (Hystericko-zúfalý výkrik šialenstva), premiere 17. 9. 1999
Prepad (Estráda), premiere 31. 12. 1998
Dno (Óda na McWorld), premiere 19. 12. 1998
Tváre, premiere 19. 12. 1997
Monodrámy, premiere 29. 11. 1997
Nox (Kto uhádne meno berného úradníka), premiere 10. 2. 1995
Eo ipso, premiere 4. 3. 1994
Nikto, len čajka si omočí nohy v mojich slzách, premiere 29. 5. 1993
Donárium (Metamorfóza premien), premiere 19. 12. 1992
Vres (Optimistická), premiere 10. 10. 1992
Slepá baba (inscenácia aj pre deti), premiéra 3. 4. 1992
Dyp inaf (Heavy mental), premiéra 6. 12. 1991
Impasse (Sentimental journey), premiéra 22. 6. 1991

External links 
rozhovor v časopise .týžděň 49/2007
rozhovor v MF Plus, 14/2007
stránky skupiny Živé kvety
stránky Divadla Stoka
rozhovor z deníku SME, 17. 8. 2004
rozhovor z týdeníku Slovo, č.38, 2004
recenze alba Sloboda z Lidových novin, 27. 4. 2006
recenze alba Sloboda na freemusic.cz

1971 births
Living people
Slovak actresses
21st-century Slovak women singers